Francisco Gómez (born 7 February 1957) is a Cuban sprinter and long jumper. He competed in the men's 100 metres at the 1976 Summer Olympics.

References

1957 births
Living people
Athletes (track and field) at the 1975 Pan American Games
Athletes (track and field) at the 1976 Summer Olympics
Cuban male sprinters
Cuban male long jumpers
Olympic athletes of Cuba
Place of birth missing (living people)
Central American and Caribbean Games medalists in athletics
Pan American Games competitors for Cuba